The 2014–15 Sam Houston State Bearkats men's basketball team represented Sam Houston State University during the 2014–15 NCAA Division I men's basketball season. The Bearkats, led by fifth year head coach Jason Hooten, played their home games at the Bernard Johnson Coliseum and were members of the Southland Conference.

The Bearkats were picked to finish third (3rd) in the Southland Conference Coaches' Poll and tied for third (3rd) in the Sports Information Directors Poll.

They finished the season 26–9, 15–3 in Southland play to finish in second place. They advanced to the championship game of the Southland tournament where they lost to Stephen F. Austin. They were invited to the CollegeInsider.com Tournament where they defeated UNC Wilmington in the first round before losing in the second round to Louisiana–Lafayette.

Roster
ֶ

Schedule
Source:
Access Date: January 17, 2015

|-
!colspan=9 style="background:#FF7F00; color:#FFFFFF;"| Regular season

|-
!colspan=9 style="background:#FF7F00; color:#FFFFFF;"| Southland tournament

|-
!colspan=9 style="background:#FF7F00; color:#FFFFFF;"| CIT

See also
2014–15 Sam Houston State Bearkats women's basketball team

References

Sam Houston Bearkats men's basketball seasons
Sam Houston State
Sam Houston State Bearkats basketball
Sam Houston State Bearkats basketball
Sam Houston State